Kaoma Airport  is an airport serving Kaoma, Western Province, Zambia. The airport is within the northern section of the city.

See also

Transport in Zambia
List of airports in Zambia

References

External links
FallingRain - Kaoma Airport
OpenStreetMap - Kaoma

 Google Earth

Airports in Zambia
Buildings and structures in Western Province, Zambia